Federal elections were held in Germany on 12 January 1912. Although the Social Democratic Party (SPD) had received the most votes in every election since 1890, it had never won the most seats, and in the 1907 elections, it had won fewer than half the seats won by the Centre Party despite receiving over a million more votes. However, the 1912 elections saw the SPD retain its position as the most voted-for party and become the largest party in the Reichstag, winning 110 of the 397 seats.

Parties hostile or ambivalent to the ruling elites of the German Empire – the Social Democrats, the Centre Party, and the left-liberal Progressives – together won a majority of the seats. This allowed a successful censure vote against the government of Theobald von Bethmann Hollweg over the Saverne Affair in 1913 and the passage of the Reichstag Peace Resolution of 1917. However, the Centre and the Progressives were unwilling to act consistently in opposition, which left the government largely free to do as it wished.

Some historians, such as Fritz Fischer, have theorized that the First World War was partly a result of the strategy of the conservative Prussian Junkers to deal with the result. In an attempt to increase support for conservative parties and policies and to distract the population from the SPD, they hoped to drum up patriotism in an external conflict with Russia or another Eastern European state such as Serbia.

Georges Weill, an SPD candidate who won a seat in Metz, defected to France at the start of World War I.

Electoral system 
The members of the Reichstag were elected in single-member constituencies via the two-round system. There was no requirement that constituencies had to be of equal sizes population sizes, meaning that rural constituencies, which tended to have smaller populations, were overrepresented.

Since 1869, suffrage was available to all residents who:

 were male,
 were at least 25 years old,
 were nationals of one of the states,
 were resident in one of the constituencies,
 were not active soldiers,
 were not convicts,
 did not live on poverty relief,
 were not incapacitated.

Since 1888, a constitutional amendment required elections to be held every five years.

Results

Alsace-Lorraine

References

1912
1912 elections in Germany
Elections in the German Empire
January 1912 events